Joy Gruttmann (born 6 December 1995) is a German child singer made famous by singing the song "Schnappi, das kleine Krokodil".

Joy has sung children's music for the ARD program Die Sendung mit der Maus since 1999. Her fifth song was "Schnappi, das kleine Krokodil," composed by her aunt Iris Gruttmann and recorded in 2001 when she was five years old. She performed as the voice of the character Schnappi, the namesake of the song. In 2004 and 2005, "Schnappi" became a No.1 hit in Germany and several other European countries such as Belgium, Netherlands, Switzerland, and Sweden. It also peaked in the Top 10 in Australia and New Zealand.

References

External links
 

1995 births
German child singers
People from Gelsenkirchen
Living people
21st-century German women singers